Werner Ernst Loeckle (4 May 1916 – 20 March 1996) was a German rower who competed in the 1936 Summer Olympics.

In 1936 he won the bronze medal as crew member of the German boat in the men's eight competition.

He was later a gynaecologist in Frankfurt.

References

1916 births
1996 deaths
Olympic rowers of Germany
Rowers at the 1936 Summer Olympics
Olympic bronze medalists for Germany
Olympic medalists in rowing
German male rowers
Medalists at the 1936 Summer Olympics
German gynaecologists